In the Neighborhood is a song by Tom Waits appearing on his 1983 album Swordfishtrombones. It released as a single in October 1983 by Island Records.

Accolades 

(*) designates unordered lists.

Formats and track listing 
All songs written by Tom Waits.

UK 7" single (IS 141)
 "In the Neighborhood" – 3:04
 "Frank's Wild Years" – 1:50

UK 12" single (12IS 160)
 "In the Neighborhood" – 3:04
 "Singapore" – 2:46
 "Tango 'Till They're Sore" Recorded live in Paris 16.11.85 – 3:20 
 "16 Shells" Recorded live in Paris 16.11.85 – 5:27

Personnel
Adapted from the In the Neighborhood liner notes.

 Tom Waits – lead vocals, production
Musicians
 Randy Aldcroft – baritone horn
 Victor Feldman – Hammond B-3 organ, snare drum, bells
 Stephen Taylor Arvizu Hodges – drums, parade drum, cymbals
 Dick "Slyde" Hyde – trombone
 Bill Reichenbach – trombone
 Larry Taylor – double bass

Production and additional personnel
 Biff Dawes – recording, mixing
 Lynn Goldsmith – photography
 Rob O'Connor – design

Release history

References

External links 
 

1982 songs
1983 singles
Tom Waits songs
Songs written by Tom Waits
Island Records singles